Wild Rivers is a Canadian folk band from Toronto, Ontario. It consists of Devan Glover (vocals), Khalid Yassein (vocals and guitar), and Andrew Oliver (guitar and synths). The band released their self-titled debut album in 2016. Their second studio album, Sidelines, was released on February 4, 2022.

History
Wild Rivers was formed at Queen's University in Kingston, Ontario, originally as a two piece with Devan Glover and Khalid Yassein.

In April 2016, the band released their self-titled debut album. In 2018, the group opened for Australian band The Paper Kites on the North American leg of their tour and released an EP titled Eighty-Eight.

In 2019 the band released the song "I Do". The following year the band released their second EP, Songs To Break Up To, through Nettwerk Music Group. Later in 2020, Wild Rivers released the single "Pink Shades". The group released another single in January 2021 titled "Love Gone Wrong". In June, Wild Rivers released the single "Amsterdam". Their second studio album, Sidelines, was released on February 4, 2022. In March 2022, their single "Thinking 'Bout Love" was certified Gold in Canada.

They received a Juno Award nomination for Breakthrough Group of the Year at the Juno Awards of 2023.

In 2023, they participated in an all-star recording of Serena Ryder's single "What I Wouldn't Do", which was released as a charity single to benefit Kids Help Phone's Feel Out Loud campaign for youth mental health.

They will open up for American country music trio The Chicks for select dates on their upcoming World Tour in summer 2023.

Discography

Studio albums
 Wild Rivers (2016, self-released)
 Sidelines (2022, Nettwerk)

EPs
 Eighty-Eight (Factor, 2018)
 Songs To Break Up To (2020, Nettwerk)

Tours
Supporting
The Chicks World Tour 2023 (2023)

References

External links
www.wildriversmusic.com

2015 establishments in Ontario
Canadian indie folk groups
Musical groups established in 2015
Musical groups from Kingston, Ontario
Musical groups from Toronto